Parish Grove Township is one of eleven townships in Benton County, Indiana. As of the 2020 census, its population was 185 and it contained 89 housing units. It contains the unincorporated town of Freeland Park.

History
Parish Grove Township was one of the county's original three created in 1840. The grove for which it is named grew close to the township's southeastern corner, near what is now the intersection of county roads 400 West and 300 South. As late as 1924 there were 37 varieties growing in the grove.

Parish Grove was home to a group of local Pottawatomie Indians led by Chief Parish (real name Pierre Moran), the son of French trader Constant Moran and a Kickapoo woman. Parish died circa 1826 and is buried in the grove, though the grave is unmarked.

Geography
Almost all of Parish Grove Township is open farmland, divided into roughly square mile blocks by regularly spaced county roads. Several small streams flow north and west toward Sugar Creek, including Mud Creek, Gretencord Ditch, Salmon Ditch, Finigan Ditch and Kult Ditch.

Unincorporated towns
 Dunnington
 Free
 Freeland Park

Adjacent townships
 Center (east)
 Grant (southeast)
 Hickory Grove (south)
 Richland (northeast)
 York (north)

Major highways
  U.S. Route 41
  State Road 18
  State Road 71

References

Citations

Sources
 United States Census Bureau cartographic boundary files
 U.S. Board on Geographic Names

External links

 Indiana Township Association
 United Township Association of Indiana

Townships in Benton County, Indiana
Lafayette metropolitan area, Indiana
Townships in Indiana
1840 establishments in Indiana